A Self-Made Widow is a lost 1917 silent film comedy drama directed by Travers Vale and starring Alice Brady.

Cast
Alice Brady - Sylvia
John Bowers - Fitzhugh Castleton
Curtis Cooksey - Bobs
Justine Cutting - Semphronia Benson
Henrietta Simpson - Lydia Van Dusen
Herbert Barrington - Crosby
Lila Chester - Della

References

External links
 A Self-Made Widow at IMDb.com

1917 films
American silent feature films
Lost American films
World Film Company films
American black-and-white films
1910s English-language films
1917 comedy-drama films
1917 lost films
Lost comedy-drama films
1910s American films
Silent American comedy-drama films